The 1906–07 Bucknell Bison men's basketball team represented Bucknell University during the 1906–07 college men's basketball season. The Bisons' team captain was James Lose.

Schedule

|-

References

Bucknell Bison men's basketball seasons
Bucknell
Bucknell
Bucknell